Zoran Ban (born 27 May 1973) is a Croatian retired professional footballer who played as a striker.

He played a match against Estonia in 1994 for the U-21 team of Croatia.

Career statistics

Club

Honours

Player

Club
Genk
 Belgian Cup: 1999–2000

References

External links
Zoran Ban

1973 births
Living people
Footballers from Rijeka
Association football forwards
Yugoslav footballers
Croatian footballers
Croatia under-21 international footballers
HNK Rijeka players
Juventus F.C. players
C.F. Os Belenenses players
Boavista F.C. players
Delfino Pescara 1936 players
Royal Excel Mouscron players
K.R.C. Genk players
R.A.E.C. Mons players
Calcio Foggia 1920 players
Yugoslav First League players
Croatian Football League players
Serie A players
Primeira Liga players
Serie B players
Belgian Pro League players
Croatian expatriate footballers
Expatriate footballers in Italy
Expatriate footballers in Portugal
Expatriate footballers in Belgium
Croatian expatriate sportspeople in Italy
Croatian expatriate sportspeople in Portugal
Croatian expatriate sportspeople in Belgium